Deepak Chainrai is a Hong Kong based businessman. He partly owns English Championship club Portsmouth F.C.

Chainrai is brother to fellow Portsmouth F.C. part owner Balram Chainrai.

Portsmouth FC
Having finally exited administration on 23 October 2010, Portsmouth F.C. confirmed the sale of the club back to Deepak's brother; Belram. Along with Levi Kushnir and Deepak Chainrai, Balram Chainrai has expressed a wish to stabilize the club, guaranteeing its future, whilst looking to loan substantial sums to the club at exorbitant rates of interest.

References

Living people
Portsmouth F.C. directors and chairmen
Year of birth missing (living people)